The Search for the Next Elvira is an American reality television series created by Eric Gardner and Cassandra Peterson for the Fox Reality channel. The reality competition show is a search to be the next late-night horror cult movie host Elvira, Mistress of the Dark.

The Judges
Cassandra Peterson as Elvira
Christian Greenia as himself / "Manvira"
Patterson Lundquist as himself / "Manvira"
Kane Hodder - Guest judge, former portrayer of horror movie icon, Jason Voorhees.
Rick Baker - Guest judge, six time Academy Award-winning special effects make-up artist.

Contestants
The "Unlucky Thirteen" included:
Ms. Monster (a.k.a. A.K. Smith), a San Francisco-based horror hostess.
Yvette Nii, a singer/ entertainer based out of Honolulu, Hawaii
Asia DeVinyl, a goth and fetish pin-up model.
Mina Rose, a model and member of Suicide Girls.
April Wahlin, an aspiring writer and a self-proclaimed tomboy.
Jenny Jenson, a marketing director who is fluent in Mandarin.
Erik-a (a.k.a. Eric Bedelman), the only male contestant to make it into the semi-finals.
Shelly Martinez, a former ECW wrestler who performed under the stage name Ariel, and former TNA Knockout.
Jilina Scott, an actress and television hostess.
Lady M (a.k.a. Milli), a former Ringling Bros. showgirl, trained Ringling clown, former Las Vegas magician's assistant, and former Peanuts characters and singer at Knott's Berry Farm's Camp Snoopy Theater.
Kitty Korvette, bassist of the Texas-based goth country band Black Molly.
Bridget Marquardt, a Playboy model and one of the stars of the reality show The Girls Next Door.
Lola Davidson, an actress.

Elimination order

External links

2007 American television series debuts
2008 American television series endings
2000s American reality television series
Television series by 20th Century Fox Television
Elvira, Mistress of the Dark